Rami George Khouri (born 22 October 1948) is a journalist and editor with Palestinian background and joint Jordanian and United States citizenship. He was born in New York City to an Arab Palestinian Christian family. His father, George Khouri, a Nazarene journalist in what was the British mandate of Palestine,  had traveled with his wife to New York in 1947 to cover the United Nations (UN) debates about the future of Palestine. His family resides in Beirut, Amman, and Nazareth. He is also a highly regarded public speaker. After attending secondary school at the International School of Geneva in Switzerland Rami Khouri returned to the US to complete his education. Khouri has served for many years as the chief umpire for Little League Baseball in Jordan.

Career
In 1971, Khouri began his career working as a reporter for the English-language newspaper The Daily Star in Beirut, Lebanon. From 1972 to 1973, Khouri continued writing columns for the paper while working as managing editor of Middle East Sketch magazine. Following a year in the United States as program administrator for the Division of International Programs Abroad at Syracuse University, Khouri returned to Beirut to become managing editor of Middle East Money in Beirut from 1973 to 1974. He then moved to Amman, Jordan, where he served as editor-in-chief of Jordan's English-language daily, the Jordan Times, from 1975 to 1982 and again from 1987

Khouri is former director of the Issam Fares Institute for Public Policy and International Affairs (IFI) at the American University of Beirut. His journalistic work includes writing books and an internationally syndicated column by progressive commentary agency Agence Global, founded by Jahan Salehi. Khouri also serves as editor at large of the Beirut-based Daily Star newspaper, published throughout the Middle East with the International Herald Tribune. He had hosted "Encounter", a weekly current affairs talk show on Jordan Television, and "Jordan Ancient Cultures", a weekly archaeology program on Radio Jordan.

Khouri was a Nieman Journalism Fellow at Harvard University (2001–2002), nonresident senior fellow of the Dubai Initiative at the Belfer Center for Science and International Affairs, John F Kennedy School of Government, Harvard University and was appointed a member of the Brookings Institution Task Force on U.S. Relations with the Islamic World. Khouri is a research associate at the Program on the Analysis and Resolution of Conflict at the Maxwell School, Syracuse University (NY, USA), a Fellow of the Palestinian Academic Society for the Study of International Affairs, Jerusalem (PASSIA), and a member of the Leadership Council of the Harvard University Divinity School. Khouri also serves on the board of the EastWest Institute, the Center for Contemporary Arab Studies at Georgetown University and the National Museum of Jordan.

He was executive editor of the Daily Star newspaper from 2003 to 2005, and had been the editor in chief of the Jordan Times for seven years before that. He also wrote for many years from Amman, Jordan for leading international publications, including the Financial Times, the Boston Globe and the Washington Post. For 18 years he was general manager of Al Kutba, publishers, in Amman, and has served as a consultant to the Jordanian tourism ministry on biblical archaeological sites. He often comments on Mideast issues in the international media, and lectures frequently at conferences and universities throughout the world.
In the fall of 2017 Khouri was a visiting professor at Villanova University.

Views on the Arab-Israeli conflict
Khouri believes that "allocating blame" is counterproductive. Writing for the Daily Star, he states that "We end up with a situation in which it becomes easy for Arabs to blame Israel and the Western powers for the problems of our region." He believes that "the truth is in between, with Arab, Israel and Western actors all having to share the blame for contributing to the distressing conditions that define the Arab world."

Awards and personal life
Khouri was the 2004 winner of the Eliav-Sartawi Awards for Middle East Journalism in the Arab Press category In November 2006, he was the co-recipient of the Pax Christi International Peace Award for his efforts to bring peace and reconciliation to the Middle East. He has BA (1970) and MSc (1998) degrees respectively in political science and mass communications from Syracuse University, New York, and is married to Ellen Kettaneh. They have two grown sons.

See also
Palestinian Christians

Published works
The Antiquities of the Jordan Rift Valley Published by Al Kutba, 1988 , 
 Petra: A Guide to the Capital of the Nabataeans Published by Longman, 1986 , 
 Jerash: A Frontier City of the Roman East Published by Longman, 1986 , 
 The Jordan Valley: Life and Society Below Sea Level Published by Longman, 1981 , 
 USAID and the Private Sector in Jordan: A Chronicle : the Genesis, August 1985-August 1988 Published by USAID, 1989
 The View from East of the Jordan Published by Center for Policy Analysis on Palestine, 1998
 Aqaba: port of Palestine on the China Sea Co-author Rami G. Khouri and Donald S. Whitcomb Published by Al Kutba, 1988
 Islamic Banking: Knotting a New Network Published by Aramco, 1987
 For Those who Share a Will to Live: Perspectives on a Just Peace in the Middle East Published by Resource Center for Nonviolence, 1985

Footnotes

External links
Column archive at The Daily Star

Rami Khouri on U.S. Policy in the Middle East, 15 November 2007
Rami Khouri collection at the American Center of Research Digital Archive

Jordanian journalists
Living people
Palestinian democracy activists
American University of Beirut alumni
Nieman Fellows
Palestinian journalists
1948 births
Palestinian non-fiction writers
Palestinian Christians
International School of Geneva alumni